Gladys Veronica Li, QC, SC (born 1948), is a  Barrister in England, a Senior Counsel at the Hong Kong Bar with a constitutional law and human rights practice, and a founding member of the Hong Kong Civic Party.

Career 
Li began to take an interest in public affairs on her return to Hong Kong in 1982, after 10 years' practice as a barrister in England. She became a member of the lobby group which sought to inform British MPs in the late 1980s about lack of democracy, absence of human rights protections and the importance of the rule of law in Hong Kong. She was Chairman of the Hong Kong Bar Association in 1995 and 1996. Ms Li has also been a member of the Article 23 Concern Group and the Article 45 Concern Group.

In 2011 she successfully represented Filipina domestic helper Evangeline Banao Vallejos in Vallejos v. Commissioner of Registration. Vallejos was seeking permanent residency after working in Hong Kong for 25 years, in a contentious challenge to the Immigration Ordinance that stirred public discussion of human rights in Hong Kong and vilification for Li. However, the CFI's decision was overturned by the Court of Appeal in 2012 and Vallejos's appeal was dismissed by the Court of Final Appeal in 2013.

Family
Li's parents are mother Marie Veronica Lillian Yang and father is Simon Li Fook-sean, a former senior judge who is part of the Li family that owns the Bank of East Asia and who stood as a candidate for Hong Kong Chief Executive in the first CE election in 1996.

References

Living people
1948 births
Barristers of Hong Kong
Hong Kong Senior Counsel
Civic Party politicians
Hong Kong women lawyers
Members of the Election Committee of Hong Kong, 2007–2012
Li family of Hong Kong
21st-century Hong Kong women politicians